Star Trek: The Kobayashi Alternative was a Star Trek themed computer software game by American studio Micromosaics, designed for the Apple II Plus, Apple IIe, and Apple IIc. The game was also available for the Commodore 64, Macintosh and IBM PC. This text adventure was first published in 1985 by Simon & Schuster. The player assumes the role of Admiral James T. Kirk. As Kirk, the player commands the actions of the Enterprise crew, as well as the Enterprise itself. 

The plot is based on the idea that Starfleet is replacing the Kobayashi Maru scenario with a new test based on a mission from the Enterprise logs. The player is supposedly testing this "Kobayashi Alternative Command Performance Evaluation" for a Starfleet admiral.

Reception
Computer Gaming World criticized Kobayashi for many bugs and poor documentation, while approving of the game's design and its portrayal of the crew. The magazine reported that version 1.1 for the Apple with improved documentation still had bugs, including a serious one when visiting Orna, and concluded "I cannot recommend it".

References

External links 
 Star Trek: The Kobayashi Alternative at MobyGames
 

1980s interactive fiction
1985 video games
Apple II games
Classic Mac OS games
Commodore 64 games
DOS games
Interactive fiction based on works
Kobayashi Alternative
Video games developed in the United States
Single-player video games